The Battle of Toulouse saw a French army led by Marshal Nicolas Soult defend the city of Toulouse against the Marquess of Wellington's British, Portuguese, and Spanish army. The fighting took place on 10 April 1814 and Soult evacuated the city late in the evening of 11 April after suffering defeat. Allied casualties in the bitter fighting exceeded French losses by more than a thousand. Official news of the end of the war did not reach Wellington until the afternoon of 12 April.

Abbreviations used

Military rank
 Gen = General
 Lt Gen = Lieutenant-General
 Maj Gen = Major-General 
 GD = général de division
 Brig Gen = Brigadier-General 
 GB = général de brigade
 Col = Colonel
 Lt Col = Lieutenant Colonel
 Maj = Major
 Capt = Captain
 Lt = Lieutenant

Other
 (w) = wounded
 (mw) = mortally wounded
 (k) = killed in action
 (c) = captured

Anglo-Allied Army
Commander-in-Chief: Field Marshal the Marquess of Wellington

Cavalry Commander: Lt Gen Stapleton Cotton

Quartermaster-General: Maj Gen Sir George Murray

Adjutant-General: Maj Gen the Hon Edward Pakenham

Military Secretary: Capt (brevet Lt Col) Lord FitzRoy Somerset

Commander, Royal Artillery: brevet Lt Col Alexander Dickson

Commander, Royal Engineers: Lt Col Howard Elphinstone

Army total: 48,765 (40,325 infantry, 6,490 cavalry, 1,950 artillery)

Wellington's Corps

Freire's Corps (part of Spanish 4th Army)
Gen Manuel Freire

Hill's Corps
Lt Gen Sir Rowland Hill

Beresford's Corps
Marshal William Beresford

French Army of Spain
Commander-in-Chief: Marshal Soult

Army total: 38,843 (31,793 infantry, 2,700 cavalry, 4,350 artillery)

References

Books
 Chandler, David. Dictionary of the Napoleonic Wars. New York: Macmillan, 1979. 
 Glover, Michael. The Peninsular War 1807-1814. London: Penguin, 2001. 
 Smith, Digby. The Napoleonic Wars Data Book. London: Greenhill, 1998. 
 Oman, Charles. Wellington's Army, 1809-1814. London: Greenhill, (1913) 1993. 

Peninsular War orders of battle